Washington Township is a township in Saline County, Kansas, in the United States.

Washington Township was organized in 1874.

References

Townships in Saline County, Kansas
Townships in Kansas